The 1997 Junior League World Series took place from August 11–16 in Taylor, Michigan, United States. Salem, New Hampshire defeated Mission Viejo, California in the championship game.

Teams

Results

References

Junior League World Series
Junior League World Series